Alan & Denise were a British male/female vocal pop duo, consisting of Alan Whittle and his wife Denise.

In April 1983, they scored medium chart success (#43) in the German charts with their single, "Rummenigge". It was a tribute to the German football player  Karl-Heinz Rummenigge. Rummenigge, who played for FC Bayern Munich, was at that time at the height of his career.

References

External links
 Alan Whittle's website

English pop music duos
English vocal groups